Sanmen Road is a station on Line 10 of the Shanghai Metro. The station is located north of the intersection of Sanmen Road with Songhu Road and Zhayin Road in the city's Yangpu District. It opened with the first phase of Line 10 on 10 April 2010.

History 
During passenger trial operations, the first and last trains at this station were 9:03 and 16:03 respectively, and all through trains at this station initially terminated at Xinjiangwancheng or Hangzhong Road. Full service with extended hours began on 3 July 2010.

Description 
The station is located just north of the intersection of Sanmen Road with Songhu Road and Zhayin Road in the Yangpu District of Shanghai. An underground station, the station consists of three floors. From street level, passengers descend to a concourse level with fare gates, ticket machines, and a customer service counter. The platform level, which consists of a single island platform, is located one level beneath the concourse level. Toilets are available at the south end of the platform, within the fare-paid zone.

In addition, this station is fully accessible. An elevator connects the street level to the concourse level near Exit 3. Within the fare-paid zone, an elevator connects the concourse level to the platform level.

Exits 
There are two opened exits of the station, numbered and signed as follows:
 Exit 3: Songhu Road, Zhayin Road (south side of the station)
 Exit 6: Songhu Road (north side of the station)

Nearby landmarks 
 Jiangwan Mosque

References 

Railway stations in Shanghai
Shanghai Metro stations in Yangpu District
Railway stations in China opened in 2010
Line 10, Shanghai Metro